Krupin may refer to the following places:
Krupin, Elbląg County in Warmian-Masurian Voivodeship (north Poland)
Krupin, Ełk County in Warmian-Masurian Voivodeship (north Poland)
Krupin, Olecko County in Warmian-Masurian Voivodeship (north Poland)
Krupin, West Pomeranian Voivodeship (north-west Poland)

See also
Krupin (surname)